The main article describes all European Soling Championships from one the first held in 1968 to the announced Championships in the near future. This article states the detailed results, where relevant the controversies, and the progression of the Championship during the series race by race of the European Soling Championships in the years 2000, 2001, 2002, 2003 and 2004. This is based on the major sources: World Sailing, the world governing body for the sport of sailing recognized by the IOC and the IPC, and the publications of the International Soling Association. Unfortunately not all crew names are documented in the major sources.

2000 Final results 

 2000 Progress

2001 Final results 

 2001 Progress

2002 Final results 

 2002 Progress

2003 Final results 

 2003 Progress

2004 Final results 

 2004 Progress

Further results
For further results see:
 Soling European Championship results (1968–1979)
 Soling European Championship results (1980–1984)
 Soling European Championship results (1985–1989)
 Soling European Championship results (1990–1994)
 Soling European Championship results (1995–1999)
 Soling European Championship results (2000–2004)
 Soling European Championship results (2005–2009)
 Soling European Championship results (2010–2014)
 Soling European Championship results (2015–2019)
 Soling European Championship results (2020–2024)

References

Soling European Championships